Iris María Fuentes-Pila Ortiz (born 10 August 1980, in Santander) is a Spanish middle distance runner who specializes in the 1500 metres.

She finished eleventh at the 2002 European Championships. She also competed at the 2004 Summer Olympics, reaching the semi final.

She and her sisters, Margarita and Zulema, were selected for the Spanish 2007 European Indoor Championships team.

Competition record

Personal bests
800 metres - 2:02.40 min (2004)
1500 metres - 4:04.25 min (2002)
3000 metres - 9:14.8 min (2002)

References

1980 births
Living people
Sportspeople from Santander, Spain
Spanish female middle-distance runners
Athletes (track and field) at the 2004 Summer Olympics
Athletes (track and field) at the 2008 Summer Olympics
Olympic athletes of Spain
Athletes from Cantabria
Athletes (track and field) at the 2001 Mediterranean Games
Mediterranean Games competitors for Spain
21st-century Spanish women